is a railway station in the city of Yamagata, Yamagata Prefecture, Japan, operated by East Japan Railway Company (JR East).

Lines
Minami-Dewa Station is served by the Ōu Main Line, and is located 93.6 rail kilometers from the terminus of the line at Fukushima Station.

Station layout
The station has one side platform serving a single bi-directional track. The station is unattended.

History
Minami-Dewa Station opened on March 5, 1952. The station was absorbed into the JR East network upon the privatization of JNR on April 1, 1987. A new station building was completed in 2000.

Surrounding area
 Yamagata Prefectural Central Hospital
 Yamagata Prefectural University of Health Sciences

See also
List of railway stations in Japan

External links

 JR East Station information 

Stations of East Japan Railway Company
Railway stations in Yamagata Prefecture
Ōu Main Line
Railway stations in Japan opened in 1952
Yamagata, Yamagata